Klingenmünster is a municipality in Südliche Weinstraße district, in Rhineland-Palatinate, western Germany.
Near Klingenmünster there is a castle called Landeck Castle.

It is the birthplace of Michael Hahn, the 19th governor of Louisiana.

Photo gallery

References

Municipalities in Rhineland-Palatinate
Palatinate Forest
Südliche Weinstraße
Palatinate (region)